Sudarshan Kapoor (also: Sudarshan Kapur) is a professor emeritus, California State University at Fresno, where he taught during several decades. In 1992 Beacon Press published his Raising Up a Prophet. The African-American encounter with Gandhi. Kapoor is an advocate of non-violence, and an activist practicing Gandhi's philosophy at both the local and national levels. A supporter of the African-American struggle for justice, he also serves as a resource on its story.

Professional life
Born in the Punjab, India, Kapoor came to the United States in 1963.

In 1967 he began to teach at Cal State Fresno, where he became Professor of Social Work, Community Development and Peace Studies. He founded the Peace and Conflict Studies Program at the University. He also started the Peace Garden project, which currently honors Gandhi, Martin Luther King Jr., Cesar E. Chavez, and Jane Addams.

In 1992 mayor Karen Humphrey appointed Kapoor to the Human Relations Commission of Fresno. He served twelve years, four as the chair. He was a founding director of the Fresno Center for Nonviolence. Since its inception in 1984 he has served on the Dr. Martin Luther King Jr. Unity Committee, City of Fresno.  Kapoor also started and co-ordinated the "Stop the Hate, Build the Culture of Peace Week" in Fresno.

Nationally, Kapoor was co-executive editor of the journal Peace & Change. He co-chaired the Consortium on Peace Research, Education and Development (now the Peace and Justice Studies Association), which is centered at Georgetown University in Washington, D.C. This group sponsors an annual conference at various universities in Canada and the United States.

Kapoor also served on the Board of the former International Peace Research Association (per UNESCO).

Raising Up a Prophet

His 1992 book starts with how the African-American community came to learn about Mohandas Gandhi and his teaching of Satyagraha. Here, W. E. B. Du Bois and Marcus Garvey were instrumental (p.4). Both oriented the African-American freedom movement to worldwide anti-colonial struggles, e.g., in India, Ireland, Egypt (13, 17, 20, 30, 61). Garvey's Universal Negro Improvement Association was in essence international (16-23). Yet "coverage of the Indian independence movement in the African-American newspapers" was the most constant source of news about Gandhi (5 quote, 208).

Beginning in the 1920s The Crisis carried a steady stream of articles, many written by Du Bois, on the strategy and tactics Gandhi was then putting into action (24-28). The journal of the A. M. E. Church was keeping its attention on the India's struggle for independence (28-29). Although many African-American were favorable to Gandhi's spirituality and his movement, there were critics. The journalist George Schuyler once in 1930 wrote that the Bolshevik use of violence would be more effective than Gandhi's methods (44). However, the "possibility of raising up a Gandhi-type leader in the African-American community" continued to be discussed (49 quote, cf. 40, 50, 66, 100, 146, 156-157). 

In 1935-36 Prof. Howard Thurman led a Christian delegation to India for six months, which met with Gandhi, and listened as he invited them to a life of satyagraha. They traded insights of struggle. Spirituals were sung while Gandhi prayed (81-83, 87-90). By 1943 an African American of the 'Quaker team' in India was marching with Gandhi (133-134). In 1950 King then a seminary student became inspired to study Gandhi (1869-1948) during a guest lecture by Mordecai Johnson, long-serving President of Howard University (2, 146-147). "His message was so profound and electrifying that I left the meeting and bought a half-dozen books on Gandhi's life and works," King later wrote (147).

As I delved deeper into the philosophy of Gandhi... I came to see for the first time its potency in the area of social reform. ¶ Gandhi  was probably the first person in history to lift the love ethic of Jesus above mere interaction of individuals to a powerful and effective social force.King (1958) p.96, (2010) p.84: quotes.

The secular Congress of Racial Equality (CORE), founded in 1942, was inspired by Gandhi's principles (117-123). Although influential, it remained an elite organization. Movement leader James Farmer told the author in a 1986 interview (195n37, 208) that "it was not till King brought non-violence into the heart of the religious community through the church that black Americans applied a Gandhian methodology of resistance on a mass scale" (123 quote). King "provided a bridge between two eras", between the Gandhi-inspired and the followers of Jesus, fusing generations of activists, to "set in motion energy [to] transform the nation" (165 quotes).

Nota Bene.
The difficult, year-long Montgomery bus boycott concluded successfully, 20 December 1956. King published in 1958 his book Stride toward Freedom, in which he acknowledged Gandhi as a major influence. In February the next year he and his wife took a 5-week trip to India, meeting with key figures in Gandhi's movement. Upon landing he said, "To other countries I may go as a tourist, but to India I come as a pilgrim".

"Gandhi and Hindutva"
In his 2000 essay, "Gandhi and Hindutva: Two conflicting visions of Swaraj", Kapur follows the competitive struggle in India between two emerging, rival religious ideologies. From the early 19th-century, the Indian cultural orientation began to include a strong surge in national awareness, the founding of several popular, revivalist societies, and the birth of political views leading to the independence movement, the struggle forSwaraj.

Notes

References
 King R. & Ed. Inst. (2019) King's India trip, Martin Luther King Jr. Research and Education Institute, Stanford University. Accessed 2021-05-16.
 King R. & Ed. Inst. (2019), Kapoor biography, The M. L. King Jr. Research and Education Institute, Stanford University. Accessed 2021-04-30.
 Sean Chabot (2013), Transnational Roots of the Civil Rights Movement. African American... Gandhi repertoire. Lexington, Lanham.
 Bidyut Chakrabarty (2013), Confluence of Thought. Mahatma Gandhi and Martin Luther King, Jr.. Oxford University Press.
 Joseph Kip Kosek (2009), Acts of Conscience. Christian nonviolence and modern American democracy. Columbia University Press.
 Gerald Horne (2009), The End of Empires. African Americans and India. Temple University Press.
 Gene Sharp (2005), Waging Nonviolent Struggle. Porter Sargent Publishers, East Boston.
 Stanley Wolpert (2001), Gandhi's Passion. The life and legacy of Mahatma Gandhi. Oxford University Press.
 Sudarshan Kapur (2000), "Gandhi and Hindutva: Two conflicting visions of Swaraj", in Parel (ed.), Gandhi, Freedom, and Self-Rule, Lexington.
 A. L. Herman (1999), Community, Violence, & Peace. SUNY Press, Albany.
 Mohandas K. Gandhi (1993), The Penguin Gandhi Reader, edited by Rudrangshu Mukherjee.
 Robert L. Harris Jr. (1993), Book Review: Kapur (1992), American Historical Review, v. 98/2 (April), pp. 570–571. Accessed 2021-04-30.
 Sudarshan Kapur (1992), Raising up a Prophet. The African-American encounter with Gandhi. Beason Press, Boston.
 Martin Luther King Jr. (1986), A Testament of Hope. The essential writings, edited by J. M. Washington. Harper & Row, San Francisco.
 Erik H. Erikson (1969), Gandhi's Truth. On the origins of militant nonviolence. W. W. Norton, New York.
 Martin Luther King Jr. (July 1959), "My trip to the Land of Gandhi" in Ebony, reprinted in King (1986).
 L. D. Reddick (1959, 2018), Crusader without Violence. Harper & Brothers, New York; reprint: NewSouth, Montgomery.
 Martin Luther King Jr. (Sept 1958), "My Pilgrimage to Nonviolence", Martin Luther King, Jr. Papers Project. Accessed 2021-05-02.
 Martin Luther King Jr. (1958, 1986, 2010), Stride toward Freedom. The Montgomery story. Harper & Row, New York; reprint Beacon Press.
 Howard Thurman (1949, 1996), Jesus and the Disinherited. Abingdon-Cokesbury, New York; Beacon, Boston.
 Krishnalal Shridharani (1939), War without Violence. Harcourt, Brace & Company, New York. 
 Richard B. Gregg, (1934, 2d 1944, 3d 1959, 2018), The Power of Nonviolence. Lippincott, Philadelphia. 1959 Foreword by King. 
 Mohandas K. Gandhi (1925-1929; 1948), The Story of My Experiments with Truth. Navjivan, Ahmedabad; Public Affairs, Wash., D.C.; Dover.

External links
 The Gandhi-King Community
 King Institute at Stanford

Nonviolence advocates
American pacifists
American social workers
Indian emigrants to the United States
Living people
Year of birth missing (living people)
California State University, Fresno faculty